Holburn is a surname. Notable people with the surname include:

Sir Alexander Holburn, 3rd Baronet (died 1772), Scottish naval officer
Bob Holburn, Canadian football player
James Holburn (disambiguation), several people
John Goundry Holburn (1843–1899), Scottish politician
Holburn Baronets